Panunzio is a surname. Notable people with the surname include:

Sergio Panunzio (1886–1944), Italian theoretician
Thom Panunzio (born 1951), American music producer and engineer